is a Japanese professional golfer.

Morofuji plays on the Japan Golf Tour, where he has won once.

Professional wins (1)

Japan Golf Tour wins (1)

*Note: The 2011 Fujisankei Classic was shortened to 36 holes due to weather.

External links

Japanese male golfers
Japan Golf Tour golfers
Sportspeople from Fukuoka Prefecture
1985 births
Living people